Andrew Pfeiffer is an Australian landscape designer. The son of a sheep and cattle farmer, he was born in Sydney and grew up on a farm in the Bega Valley, near Candelo.

On the recommendation of the English landscape designer, Russell Page, Pfeiffer studied horticulture and landscape design at the Arboretum Kalmthout in Belgium and at the Royal Botanic Gardens, Kew, in London. He later worked as a student gardener at both the Bowhill House and Boughton House estates, as well as at the Arboretum des Grandes Bruyeres in The Loire Valley and Villa Noailles near Grasse in France.

Pfeiffer's first gardens were made in England, Austria, and Germany, followed by a number of commissions in Australia. He is based in Sydney and London, and has since worked around the world.

Two Pfeiffer-designed gardens (a desert garden in Sydney and a woodland garden in Bloomfield Hills, Michigan) were featured in the 2008 book Luxury Private Gardens. Pfeiffer wrote: "When gardens like the one at Château de Courances in the Île-de-France near Paris or the Odette Monteiro estate at Correias near Rio de Janeiro are stripped down to their bare essentials, they are like a well-cut couturier’s gown—nothing but an utterly simple response to the unadorned landscape or the naked human body they are designed to fit."

Pfeiffer believes that "great gardens have a timeless quality" and "should be thought of with a long view, and not in terms of superficial and fleeting fashion." "The natural surroundings, combined with a sense of place, should always determine the character of a garden."

Books
 Pfeiffer, Andrew (1985) Australian Garden Design, Macmillan, 
Pfeiffer, Andrew (1994) Creating Style, Weldon, 
Pfeiffer, Andrew (2000) A Sense of Place: The Gardens of Andrew Pfeiffer, Viking, 
 Falkenberg, Haike (ed.) (2008) Luxury Private Gardens, teNeues, 
Pfeiffer, Andrew (2020) Quartermain, Monkey Temple House,

References

Year of birth missing (living people)
Living people
Australian gardeners
Australian landscape or garden designers
Garden writers
People educated at Cranbrook School, Sydney